Afric Simone (born Henrique Simone, 17 July 1956) is a Mozambican vocalist, musician, performance artist, multi-instrumentalist, dancer and entertainer. He entered the European charts with his first hit "Ramaya" in 1975, which was followed by another well-known song, "Hafanana", which was released later the same year.

Simone reached the peak of his popularity between 1975 and 1980 on both sides of the Iron Curtain, hence he toured the USSR, Poland, the GDR and Czechoslovakia in the Eastern Bloc, and retains that popularity even today throughout Europe.

Simone is one of the most prominent African musicians, being one of the few musicians of Mozambican ethnicity who sold-out shows at major international venues including L'Olympia, The Royal Albert Hall and the Carnegie Hall.

Biography 
Simone was born in Inhambane, to a Brazilian father and Mozambique-origin mother, but at the age of 9 (after his father's death) he and his mother had to move to her motherland Mozambique on the east coast of Africa, at Xipamanine in the capital city Lourenço Marques, now Maputo.

Once, when he appeared on stage in Maputo, his manager asked him to come to London. With first steps in show business in London, he has gathered invaluable experience for appearances in other European capitals. He gathered experience in doing gigs all over Europe. He was lucky that Eddie Barclay, the French record tycoon, went to see a show in Paris. They immediately signed the contract.

Afric Simone speaks German, English, Portuguese, French, Spanish, and various African languages, however his songs are written in the mixture of Swahili and few words from other languages. This idea resulted in a mixture of his own native tongue and European Happy Sound. Simone is also said to have pioneered the arts of breakdancing and beatboxing as can be seen in his live performances, for instance in the televised performance of his song "Playa Blanca", c.1975.

In 1978, he settled in Berlin, Germany. Afric Simone has been married 3 times. His current wife is ethnically Russian. They have met in Berlin in 2003. Afric Simone has been appearing in TV shows in France, Italy, Germany and Belarus.

Discography

Albums 
 1974 - Mr. Barracuda (BASF, 2021932)
 1975 - Ramaya (Barclay, 70024)
 1976 - Aloha Playa Blanca (CNR)
 1978 - Boogie Baby (RCA)
 1978 - Jambo Jambo (Epic)
 1981 - Marria Sexy Bomba De Paris (Epic)
 1990 - Afro Lambada (Multisonic)

CD 
 1989 - Best of Afric Simone (re-edition 2002 with bonus tracks)

Singles 
 1974 - "Barracuda" / "Hûmbala" (Ariola 1974)
 1975 - "Ramaya" / "Piranha" (Barclay, BRCNP 40066)
 1976 - "Hafanana" / "Sahara" (Barclay, BRCNP 40072)
 1976 - "Aloha-Wamayeh" / "Al Capone" (Hansa, 17 586 AT)
 1977 - "Maria Madalena" / "Aloha" (Barclay)
 1977 - "Playa Blanca" / "Que Pasa Mombasa" (Musart, MI 30387)
 1978 - "Playa Blanca" / Marabu (Barclay)
 1980 - "China Girl" / "Salomé" (Barclay)

References

1956 births
Living people
Mozambican guitarists
21st-century Mozambican male singers
People from Maputo
Mozambican emigrants to Germany